Simcoe Composite School is a high school in Simcoe, Ontario, Canada.

More than 800 students attend this rural secondary school and courses range from English, French, Art,  Music, and Mathematics to Computer Sciences, Business, Athletics, Cosmetology, Tech, World History, Civics, and Drama class. In 2003, the school suffered the loss of their gym in an act of arson. Several years and many fundraisers later, the Sabredome was officially opened again in 2006. Megan Timpf, a representative for the 2008 Canadian softball team at the Olympic Games in Beijing attended this high school.

Other notable alumni include the late saxophonist Margo Davidson, one of the founding members of The Parachute Club, which achieved international success in the 1980s, and Rick Danko, the  bassist of The Band. Rob Blake, the former captain of the Los Angeles Kings of the NHL and Olympic Gold Medal winner for men's ice hockey, also attended Simcoe Composite School starting in 1983 and ending around 1987. Dr. Robert Gardner emigrated to this school from Glasgow, Scotland and graduated as a member of the Class of 1956.

Campus life

Bridge special needs program
There is also a special education program called Bridge that teaches mentally challenged children how to adapt to adult life in the community. People in the Bridge program range from 14 to 21 years of age and can range from high functioning to severely handicapped.

Athletics
Simcoe Composite School students participate in the follow sports on a high school level:
 basketball 
 football
 soccer 
 track and field 
 hockey  
 swimming
 cross country
 cheerleading (informally referred to as cheer)
 badminton 
 golf 
 tennis
volleyball

Simcoe Composite School has a football team, basketball team, a soccer team, and a hockey team that collectively use the school team name Sabres. The school's swimming team uses the school team name Sabrecuda which is said to be a cross between the conventional sabre and the barracuda.

Annual awards are given out for the best athletes in all the sports in the middle of June; as it represents the last week in the school year.

Future
While most other non-religious high schools will remain open in the foreseeable future, they will see more than 1000 empty seats in their classes by 2017. Everything from homeschooling to the rapidly aging local population to the increasing popularity of virtual high schools on the Internet has stunted the ability of the secular high schools to maintain full classrooms in recent years.

One of the solutions that could save Simcoe Composite School is to wait for the children in the elementary-grade French immersion classes to graduate into the secondary school system and turn most of the area high schools into "French-immersion" high schools. If all else fails and attendance continues to decline, another solution would be to close down this school and Waterford District High School in favor of a new secular high school spanning  somewhere in Norfolk County. Valley Heights Secondary School and Delhi District Secondary School would remain open as their enrolment numbers are still sufficient for their level of government funding.

An International Baccalaureate program will be investigated on starting January 31, 2013. The health sciences program will receive additional partnerships from colleges, university, and from the healthcare system.

See also
List of high schools in Ontario

References

External links
 
Grand Erie District School Board
Weather Network

Educational institutions established in 1893
High schools in Norfolk County, Ontario
School buildings in Canada destroyed by arson
1893 establishments in Ontario